Rosângela Lula da Silva (born 27 August 1966), commonly known by her nickname Janja, is a Brazilian sociologist and the  First Lady of Brazil as the wife of president Luiz Inácio Lula da Silva.

Biography
Rosângela was born on 27 August 1966 in União da Vitória, state of Paraná. She moved to Curitiba during her childhood. Silva joined the Workers' Party in 1983. In 1990, she enrolled the studies of Social Science at the Federal University of Paraná and specialized in History in the same institution. Janja was hired by Itaipu Binacional on 1 January 2005; at the time, there were no civil service examinations, and she was hired through curriculum analysis and interview. At the hydroelectric power plant, she was assistant to the Director-General and coordinator of programs backed to sustainable development. Between 2012 and 2016, Rosângela was communications and institutional affairs advisor at Eletrobras, in Rio de Janeiro. In 2016, she returned to Itaipu. Janja officially left the company on 1 January 2020.

Personal life
Janja and Luiz Inácio Lula da Silva began dating in 2018, and she frequently visited him when he was arrested at the Federal Police headquarters in Curitiba. When Lula was released on 8 November 2019, they announced their engagement. They officially married on 18 May 2022 in São Paulo by Catholic Bishop Angélico Sândalo Bernardino.

See also
 Marisa Letícia Lula da Silva

References

External links
 
 

1966 births
Living people
People from Paraná (state)
First ladies of Brazil
Brazilian feminists
Brazilian sociologists
Workers' Party (Brazil) politicians
Luiz Inácio Lula da Silva
Federal University of Paraná alumni
20th-century Brazilian women
21st-century Brazilian women scientists